In probability theory and statistics, the bivariate von Mises distribution is a probability distribution describing values on a torus. It may be thought of as an analogue on the torus of the bivariate normal distribution. The distribution belongs to the field of directional statistics. The general bivariate von Mises distribution was first proposed by Kanti Mardia in 1975. One of its variants is today used in the field of bioinformatics to formulate a probabilistic model of protein structure in atomic detail,  such as backbone-dependent rotamer libraries.

Definition 
The probability density function of the general bivariate von Mises distribution for the angles  is given by

Two commonly used variants of the bivariate von Mises distribution are the sine and cosine variant.

The cosine variant of the bivariate von Mises distribution has the probability density function

The sine variant has the probability density function

where the parameters have the same interpretation.

See also 
 Von Mises distribution, a similar distribution on the one-dimensional unit circle
 Kent distribution, a related distribution on the two-dimensional unit sphere
 von Mises–Fisher distribution
 Directional statistics

References 

Continuous distributions
Directional statistics
Multivariate continuous distributions